Earl Zindars (September 25, 1927 – August 15, 2005) was an American composer of jazz and classical music.

Biography

Trained as a classical and jazz percussionist, Zindars went on to compose works for both orchestra and piano. Many of his jazz piano works were recorded by his friend Bill Evans.

Pianist Bill Cunliffe brought out a CD entitled How My Heart Sings, dedicating it exclusively to the music of Zindars. Cunliffe described Zindars' contribution:He (Zindars) was an interesting composer in that he was one of the first, along with Brubeck, to write songs where the time signature changes. For example, on 'How My Heart Sings,' the first part of the song is in a waltz feel, but the middle part of the tune is in a 4/4, medium, swing jazz feel. That was very, very innovative for the fifties. Very few guys were doing that. His music is very interesting harmonically as well and he has a really strong melodic sense. He's a very good composer.

Zindars appeared on KCSM's Desert Island Jazz program in 2003.

"Zindars, who expressed himself more through his music than words, composed his final composition less than a month" before dying; "it was called 'Roses for Annig' and was dedicated to his wife of 43 years."

He released two Compact Discs with his compositions: “The Return” and “And Then Some”. They were limited releases but featured local pianists (Don Haas and Larry Dunlap) and were quite simply amazing.

He died of cancer in San Francisco at the age of 77.

References

External links
 Zindars.com
  Letter From Evans- Hinkle, Win. 1993.  Please see pages 18–21 for extensive interview with Earl Zindars.

Further reading
 

American jazz composers
American male jazz composers
DePaul University alumni
Bienen School of Music alumni
Alumni of the University of Oxford
Columbia University fellows
1927 births
2005 deaths
Musicians from Chicago
20th-century American composers
Jazz musicians from Illinois
20th-century American male musicians
20th-century jazz composers